Robert J. Humphreys (born 1950) is a Judge of the Virginia Court of Appeals.

Life and education

Humphreys was born in 1950 in San Diego, California. He received his Bachelor of Arts from Washington and Lee University and his Juris Doctor from Widener University School of Law.

Legal career

Prior to becoming a judge he served as an Assistant Attorney General for the State of Delaware, Assistant Commonwealth’s Attorney in Norfolk, Virginia and Chief Deputy Commonwealth’s Attorney in Virginia Beach, as a partner in the law firm of McCardell, Inman, Benson, Strickler & Humphreys, P.C. in Virginia Beach and he served as Commonwealth's Attorney of Virginia Beach from 1990–2000.

Service on Virginia Court of Appeals

He was first elected by the General Assembly on March 9, 2000, to an eight-year term beginning April 16, 2000. He was subsequently elected to a second eight-year term in 2008.

Memberships

He is a past president of the Virginia Association of Commonwealth’s Attorneys and past Chairman of the Commonwealth’s Attorneys Services Council. He chaired the Virginia State Bar Task Force on Revisions to Rule 4.2, Rules of Professional Responsibility. He also currently serves as the Vice-Chairman of the Virginia Criminal Sentencing Commission and as President of the James Kent American Inn of Court.

References

External links

Living people
1950 births
20th-century American lawyers
21st-century American judges
Judges of the Court of Appeals of Virginia
Lawyers from San Diego
Virginia lawyers
Washington and Lee University alumni
Widener University School of Law alumni